is a Japanese pop singer and lyricist signed to SACRA MUSIC and managed by agehasprings. Her stage name comes from the verb "Aimer" in French, which means "to love". Aimer uses the name aimerrhythm for lyrics credits.

Debuting in 2011, she has released six studio albums, all of which made it into the top 20 of the Oricon Albums Chart, with fourth album Daydream being certified Gold by the Recording Industry Association of Japan. Her 2021 song "Zankyōsanka" became her first song to reach the top of the Japan Hot 100 chart, selling 87,649 downloads in its first week. It also charted at number 37 on the Billboard Global 200, marking her first appearance on the chart.

Early life
Aimer's father was a bassist in a band, so music surrounded her from a very young age. She started piano study in elementary school and admired the music of Ringo Sheena and Hikaru Utada. In junior high school, the music of Avril Lavigne inspired her to take up guitar and began writing lyrics in English. At the age of 15, Aimer lost her voice due to vocal cord overuse and underwent silence therapy for treatment. After she recovered, she acquired her distinctive husky voice.

Career
Aimer teamed up with the "Agehasprings" group, which has worked with, produced, or provided music for various artists, including Yuki, Mika Nakashima, Flumpool, Superfly, Yuzu, and Genki Rockets. In 2011, her musical career began in earnest. In May 2011, they released the concept album Your favorite things. It covered numerous popular works, including works in various genre such as jazz and country western music. The number 1 record cover was based on Lady Gaga's "Poker Face", and was the first song to appear in the lead album chart for the jazz category in the iTunes Store. The album reached number 2.

On September 7, 2011, Aimer debuted for Defstar Records, with the song "Rokutousei no Yoru", which was selected by Fuji TV as the ending theme of the 2011 anime series No. 6. "Rokutousei no Yoru" recorded its highest ranking at number 9 on the Recochoku music distribution chart. The second single was released on December 14, 2011. "Re:pray/ Sabishikute Nemurenai Yoru wa" reached number 1 in the Mora music download charts site. The song "Re: pray" was chosen as the 29th ending theme for the anime Bleach. The single also includes the cover of "Poker Face" from Your Favorite Things.

On February 22, 2012, she released her third single, "Yuki no Furumachi/Fuyu no Diamond", which had the theme of "winter" on all tracks. On May 11, 2012, Aimer released a digital single called "Hoshikuzu Venus". This single was intended to be the theme song and background music for Sasaki Nozomi's drama, Koi nante Zeitaku ga Watashi ni Ochite Kuru no daro ka?. This drama aired on April 16, 2012. On August 15, Aimer released her fourth single, "Anata ni Deawanakereba: Kasetsu Toka / Hoshikuzu Venus", which included a cover of Neil Sedaka's "Breaking Up Is Hard to Do". The first track of this single "Anata ni Deawanakereba: Kasetsu Toka" is an ending song of Fuji TV's anime series Natsuyuki Rendezvous.

On March 20, 2013, Aimer released the single "Re: I Am", which was used as the ending theme for the penultimate episode of Mobile Suit Gundam Unicorn. According to an interview, the song title "is an anagram of [her] name (Aimer), and has the meaning of breaking down a word and constructing it into another." Aimer's eighth single, "Brave Shine", appeared as the second opening theme to the Fate/stay night: Unlimited Blade Works anime, and was released on June 3, 2015. Another song, "Last Stardust", which was also a candidate for the opening, appears as an insert song in episode #20.

On August 18, 2016, Aimer announced her special 4th studio album Daydream would be released on September 21 featuring collaboration songs between her and popular artists such as Taka (ONE OK ROCK), Yojiro Noda (RADWIMPS), TK (Ling tosite sigure), chelly (EGOIST), Takahito Uchisawa (androp), Hiroyuki Sawano, Sukima Switch, and Mao Abe. Taka additionally produced four new songs for this album, while TK provided two. Also includes the ending theme of Kabaneri of the Iron Fortress (anime) made in collaboration with chelly (EGOIST) and Hiroyuki Sawano and more for 13 tracks total. The album was released in three versions: a limited CD+Blu-ray (Type-A), a limited CD+DVD edition (Type-B), and a regular CD only edition. The song "Falling Alone" was used as lead track and was previously released as her 10th digital single as advance of the album.

On August 20, 2016, Aimer revealed her face for the first time on Music Station with the song "Chouchou Musubi". Following the announcement of her 4th album Daydream, Aimer performed the ending song to the Season 5 of anime series Natsume's Book of Friends, "Akane Sasu".
On January 5, 2017, it was announced that Aimer wrote a song for the Japanese culinary exhibition "Tabegamisama no Fushigina Resutoranten" directed by the multimedia entertainment studio Moment Factory. A day after it was revealed on Aimer's official Twitter profile that the name of the song for the exhibition would be "Kachō Fūgetsu". Later, it was also revealed another single, which would be used as opening theme for the Japanese drama Ubai ai, fuyu, titled "Kogoesōna Kisetsu Kara", and would be released on February 10, 2017. The compilation albums Best Selection "blanc" and Best Selection "noir" were released on May 3, 2017. On November 11, Aimer released the single "ONE", which peaked at #2 on both Oricon and Billboard Japan charts.

Her single "Ref:rain" was released digitally on February 18, 2018, and received a physical release on February 21, 2018. The song is used as the ending theme to the 2018 anime television series After the Rain. On September 7, 2018, Aimer released the single "Black Bird", which was used as the theme song for the Japanese live-action film adaptation of the manga Kasane.
On January 8, 2019, Aimer released the single "I beg you" for the anime film Fate/stay night: Heaven's Feel II. lost butterfly. The song became her first #1 single on Oricon's chart. She released two simultaneous albums, Sun Dance and Penny Rain, on April 10, 2019. She recorded the ending theme song "Torches" for the anime adaptation of the manga series Vinland Saga. She released her 18th single "Haru wa Yuku" on March 25, 2020. The song serves as the main theme of the anime film Fate/stay night: Heaven's Feel III. spring song. Aimer's song, "Spark-Again" has become the opening theme to the season 2 of the hit series Fire Force. In 2021, Aimer's song "Zankyōsanka" was used for season two of Demon Slayer: Kimetsu no Yaiba. In 2022, her song "Deep Down" also featured as one of the 12 ending theme songs for the anime Chainsaw Man, which was used in the 9th episode. In early 2023, Aimer's song "Escalate" was featured as the opening theme for the anime Nier: Automata Ver1.1a, that aired on January 8, 2023.

Personal life
On January 1, 2023, Aimer announced that she married musician Masahiro Tobinai.

Discography

Studio albums

Compilation albums

Mini albums

Singles

Cover albums

Live videos

Collaboration albums

Guest appearances

Filmography

Music videos

Kōhaku Uta Gassen appearances

Tours 
 Aimer "soleil et pluie" Asia Tour (2019)

Awards and nominations

Notes

References

External links 

 
 Aimer at Sony Music Entertainment Japan
 Aimer at Ageha Springs
 
 Aimer discography on iTunes
 Aimer discography on Discogs

1991 births
21st-century Japanese women singers
21st-century Japanese singers
Defstar Records artists
Japanese women pop singers
Japanese jazz singers
Living people
Musicians from Kumamoto Prefecture
English-language singers from Japan
Sacra Music artists
Sony Music Entertainment Japan artists
Japanese women rock singers